Metzneria littorella, the Isle of Wight neb, is a moth of the family Gelechiidae. It was described by Douglas in 1850. It is found in Great Britain, Spain, France, Italy, on Corsica, Sardinia, Sicily, Cyprus and in Russia.

References

Moths described in 1850
Metzneria